The Queen Elizabeth II Platinum Jubilee Medal or the Queen's Platinum Jubilee Medal is a commemorative medal created to mark the 70th anniversary of Queen Elizabeth II's accession in 1952.

The medal was awarded in the United Kingdom to people who worked in public service, including the Armed Forces, the emergency services, and the prison services. In Canada, six of the country's 10 provinces issuied their own medals; the first time in Canadian history that a royal occasion has been commemorated on provincial medals. Outstanding volunteers, members of the Canadian Armed Forces and emergency services, and other people who made a positive impact on society were deemed eligible to receive the medals, with particular focus in some provinces on the response to the COVID-19 pandemic, reconciliation with First Nations and Inuit, and protection of the environment. The Queen's Caribbean realms also instituted a medal programme for the Platinum Jubilee. Examples of those eligible there were members of the emergency services who responded during hurricanes and the COVID-19 pandemic and of the defence and police forces.

United Kingdom

Design
The medal, made of nickel silver, has the Ian Rank-Broadley effigy of Her Majesty on the obverse. The reverse shows the helm, crest, and mantling of the royal coat of arms of the United Kingdom used outside Scotland. The ribbon has silver edges, representing the Silver Jubilee; the blue from the ribbon of the Golden Jubilee medal; and the red from the Diamond Jubilee ribbon. Worcestershire Medal Service is manufacturing the medal.

Eligibility
Those who received the medal for the Queen's Platinum Jubilee were:

 Serving members of the Armed Forces who completed five full calendar years of service on 6 February 2022.
 Volunteer Reserve and ex-Regular Reservists of the Armed Forces who had received five Certificates of Efficiency.
 Uniformed cadet force adult volunteers in MOD sponsored cadet forces with 1826 days membership (not necessarily continuous) and five effective training years of which 2021/2022 must be one. An effective training year is 15 days service between 1 April and 31 March (7 in 2020/21 and 10 in 2021/22 to account for covid), with a parade evening counting as a quarter day.
 Frontline emergency services personnel who had been in paid service, retained, or, in a voluntary capacity (eg BASICS Responders), had dealt with emergencies as part of their conditions of service, and had completed five full calendar years of service on 6 February 2022.
 Prison services personnel who were publicly employed, and were regularly exposed to difficult and sometimes emergency situations, who had completed five full calendar years of service on 6 February 2022.
 Members of the Royal Household with one year of qualifying service.
 Living individual recipients of the Victoria Cross and George Cross.

Canada
The government of Canada opted not to produce a Platinum Jubilee medal, despite having issued medals for royal jubilees since at least Queen Victoria's in 1897. The decision was criticized by the Royal Canadian Legion and the Monarchist League of Canada. In response, the provinces of Prince Edward Island, Nova Scotia, New Brunswick, Manitoba, Alberta, and Saskatchewan instituted a provincial Platinum Jubilee medal to mark the Queen's 70 years on the Canadian throne.

On 3 November 2022, the Governor General signed an order-in-council approving the insertion of all the provincial Platinum Jubilee medals into the order of precedence in the Canadian honours system, following all the medals under the heading Other Medals in Section 1 of the Canadian Orders, Decorations, and Medals Directive, 1998.

Design

The designs of the medals are similar in all the provinces that produced one, differing only in each depicting the shield of the particular province's coat of arms, as well as the province's official flower—the wild rose for Alberta, prairie crocus for Manitoba, purple violet for New Brunswick, mayflower for Nova Scotia, pink lady's slipper for Prince Edward Island, and western red lily for Saskatchewan. All are silver in colour, 32mm in diameter, and with a ring suspension. The obverse depicts the same crowned effigy of the Queen that was previously used for the Canadian Queen Elizabeth II Diamond Jubilee Medal, while the reverse displays the Queen's royal cypher with the dates of her reign—1952 and 2022—on either side, at the top. The provincial shield of arms is in the centre, on both sides of which are renderings of the official flower of the province and, appearing at the base, is the motto VIVAT REGINA ("long live the Queen!").

The ribbon uses a new arrangement of the blue, red, and white colours found in the ribbons of the Queen Elizabeth II Coronation Medal, Queen Elizabeth II Silver Jubilee Medal, Queen Elizabeth II Golden Jubilee Medal, and Queen Elizabeth II Diamond Jubilee Medal.

Alberta

The Queen Elizabeth II Platinum Jubilee Recognition Act was introduced in the Legislature of Alberta on 22 February 2022 and received royal assent on 24 March of the same year. The act included the creation of a medal to be awarded to 7,000 Albertans who had made significant contributions to society. Three minimum criteria were set for the medal recipients; the nominee must have: been a Canadian citizen or permanent resident with a tangible link to Alberta at the time the medal was granted; made a significant contribution to Canada, Alberta, or to a particular Alberta region or community; and been alive on 6 February 2022.

Manitoba

Lieutenant Governor Janice Filmon and Premier Heather Stefanson announced, on 28 April 2022, the creation of the Queen's Platinum Jubilee Medal for Manitoba, the design of which was unveiled on 2 June in the same year.

A total of 1,000 medals were awarded at ceremonies held throughout the province during the Platinum Jubilee year. There were three minimum criteria for the medal recipients: be a resident of Manitoba or have a link to Manitoba at the time of the grant of the medal; have made a contribution to Canada, Manitoba, or to a particular region or community; and have been alive on 6 February 2022.

New Brunswick

The Queen Elizabeth II Platinum Jubilee Medal (New Brunswick) was awarded to 3,000 deserving individuals; one third of the total medals were specifically intended for those who had made outstanding contributions to the province's COVID-19 pandemic response. The program was launched on 2 June 2022 and was administered by the Office of Protocol of New Brunswick.

Nominees had to have resided in the province or had a tangible link to New Brunswick; had been alive as of 6 February 2022; and must have made a significant contribution to New Brunswick or to a particular region, community, or field. A specific focus was placed on those individuals who played a significant role in New Brunswick's COVID-19 pandemic response at the local level over an extended period of time; made a tangible contribution to New Brunswick's reconciliation efforts with Indigenous peoples; made a contribution to New Brunswick's diversity and inclusion goals; provided volunteer service at the local level; served or are serving in the Canadian Armed Forces, Royal Canadian Mounted Police, and other emergency services; and/or made a positive impact on the preservation of the environment.

Nova Scotia

On 30 March 2022, Lieutenant Governor Arthur J LeBlanc announced the establishment of the Queen's Platinum Jubilee Medal for Nova Scotia. Five thousand medals were awarded across the province until 5 February 2023. LeBlanc announced on 2 June that the Queen had approved the design of the medal. On the same day, the names of the first 70 recipients were released and the inaugural investiture ceremony took place at the Westin Nova Scotian hotel in Halifax on 4 August.

To be eligible for the medal, a person must have been a resident of Nova Scotia or have had a strong direct connection with the province; have made a significant contribution to Canada, Nova Scotia, or to a particular region or community; and been alive on 6 February 2022.

Prince Edward Island

The Queen Elizabeth II Platinum Jubilee Medal programme in Prince Edward Island saw a total of 584 medals distributed to Islanders. The programme ran to the end of the Queen's Platinum Jubilee Year, 5 February 2023.

Eligible recipients must have resided in the province or had a tangible link to Prince Edward Island; made a significant contribution to Prince Edward Island, a region, community, or a field; and been alive on 6 February 2022. Medals were awarded to those who had also devoted themselves to making the province a better place and made a significant contribution, which included providing volunteer service at the local level; contributing to the province's reconciliation efforts with indigenous peoples; contributing to the province's diversity and inclusion goals, including the promotion of the Acadian and Francophone community; served in the Canadian Armed Forces, Royal Canadian Mounted Police, and/or emergency services; and/or made a positive impact on the preservation of the environment.

Saskatchewan

Lieutenant Governor Russell Mirasty announced on 30 March 2022 the creation of the Queen Elizabeth II Platinum Jubilee Medal (Saskatchewan), which will honour significant contributions and achievements throughout Saskatchewan. 7,000 medals will be awarded throughout the province during the jubilee year. 

On 30 August, 70 Saskatchewanians were presented with jubilee medals by Mirasty at the inaugural investiture ceremony, which took place in the Regency Ballroom of the Hotel Saskatchewan, in Regina.

The three minimum criteria for the medal recipients were: be a resident of Saskatchewan or have had a link to Saskatchewan at the time of the grant of the medal; have made a contribution to Canada, Saskatchewan, or to a particular region or community; and have been alive on 6 February 2022.

Canadian pin
Every member of parliament was given a limited supply of Queen Elizabeth II Platinum Jubilee pins to distribute. The pins have seven sides to represent the Queen's seven decades on the throne and include Elizabeth's royal cypher and maple leaves.

Caribbean
The Queen's Caribbean realms also instituted a medal programme for the Platinum Jubilee.

The obverse bears the same effigy of the Queen as does the British medal circumscribed by the words PLATINUM JUBILEE HM QUEEN ELIZABETH II. The ribbon of the Caribbean medal is similar to the British version, with silver edges, representing the Silver Jubilee; the blue from the ribbon of the Golden Jubilee medal; and the red from the Diamond Jubilee medal ribbon.

Antigua and Barbuda
During their visit to Antigua and Barbuda on 25 April, the Earl and Countess of Wessex and Forfar presented Platinum Jubilee medals to three people at Government House to recognise their service to national security.

Belize
Serving frontline members for their service during Hurricanes Eta and Iota and, more recently, to those who served during the COVID-19 pandemic.

Jamaica
In Jamaica, Platinum Jubilee medals were awarded to members of the Jamaica Defence Force, the Jamaica Constabulary Force, the Department of Correctional Services, the Jamaica Fire Brigade and the Emergency Medical Services.

On 29 July 2022, Governor-General Sir Patrick Allen presented jubilee medals during the Armed Forces Day Parade at Up Park Camp in Kingston. A total of 1056 members of the Jamaica Defence Force, including one woman, were acknowledged with the Queen's Platinum Jubilee Medal. This was awarded to service members of the Regular and Reserve Force, who completed 18 years of service on 6 February 2022.

Precedence in each realm
Some orders of precedence are as follows:

See also
 Queen Elizabeth II Coronation Medal
 Queen Elizabeth II Silver Jubilee Medal
 Queen Elizabeth II Golden Jubilee Medal
 Queen Elizabeth II Diamond Jubilee Medal
 List of monarchs in Britain by length of reign
 List of jubilees of British monarchs

References

External links
 In Pictures: The UK’s history of Jubilee Medals at platinumjubilee.gov.uk
 Queen Elizabeth II's Platinum Jubilee Medal (Provincial) at Canada.ca

Platinum Jubilee of Elizabeth II
Civil awards and decorations of the United Kingdom
Civil awards and decorations of Canada
Alberta awards
Saskatchewan awards
New Brunswick awards
Nova Scotia awards
Prince Edward Island awards
Manitoba awards
Civil awards and decorations of Australia
Civil awards and decorations of New Zealand
Civil awards and decorations of Jamaica
Monarchy in Canada